The women's artistic team all-around competition at the 1936 Summer Olympics was held at the Waldbühne on 12 August. It was the second appearance of the event.

Competition format
The gymnastics format returned to the aggregation format used in 1928, when women’s gymnastics debuted at the Olympic Games. Each nation entered a team of eight gymnasts. All entrants in the gymnastics competitions performed both a compulsory exercise and a voluntary exercise on each of the three apparatus, with the scores summed to give a final total. Each team also performed two group exercises. The top six individual scores on each team and the two group exercises were summed to give a team all-around score. No individual medals (for either all-around or apparatus) were awarded for women.

Results

References

Women's artistic team all-around
1936
Women's events at the 1936 Summer Olympics